The 2017 Alpha Energy Solutions 250 was the third stock car race of the 2017 NASCAR Camping World Truck Series and the 19th iteration of the event. The race was held on Saturday, April 1, 2017, in Martinsville, Virginia at Martinsville Speedway, a  permanent oval-shaped short track. The race took the 250 laps to complete. At race's end, Chase Elliott, driving for GMS Racing, would defend the field on the final restart with 12 to go to win his second career NASCAR Camping World Truck Series win and his only win of the season. To fill out the podium, Johnny Sauter of GMS Racing and Christopher Bell of Kyle Busch Motorsports would finish second and third, respectively.

Background 

Martinsville Speedway is an NASCAR-owned stock car racing track located in Henry County, in Ridgeway, Virginia, just to the south of Martinsville. At 0.526 miles (0.847 km) in length, it is the shortest track in the NASCAR Cup Series. The track was also one of the first paved oval tracks in NASCAR, being built in 1947 by H. Clay Earles. It is also the only remaining race track that has been on the NASCAR circuit from its beginning in 1948.

Entry list 

 (R) denotes rookie driver.
 (i) denotes driver who is ineligible for series driver points.

*Withdrew.

Practice 
Originally, two practice sessions were scheduled to be held, both being held on Friday, March 31. However, rain would cancel the second session.

The only 55-minute practice session was held on Friday, March 31, at 1:00 PM EST.

Qualifying 
Qualifying was held on Saturday, April 1, at 12:05 PM EST. Since Martinsville Speedway is a short track, the qualifying system was a multi-car system that included three rounds. The first round was 15 minutes, where every driver would be able to set a lap within the 15 minutes. Then, the second round would consist of the fastest 24 cars in Round 1, and drivers would have 10 minutes to set a lap. Round 3 consisted of the fastest 12 drivers from Round 2, and the drivers would have 5 minutes to set a time. Whoever was fastest in Round 3 would win the pole.

Three drivers would fail to qualify: Austin Wayne Self, Norm Benning, and Chuck Buchanan Jr.

Full qualifying results

Race results 
Stage 1 Laps: 70

Stage 2 Laps: 70

Stage 3 Laps: 110

Standings after the race 

Drivers' Championship standings

Note: Only the first 8 positions are included for the driver standings.

References 

2017 NASCAR Camping World Truck Series
NASCAR races at Martinsville Speedway
April 2017 sports events in the United States
2017 in sports in Virginia